Rulin Subdistrict is a subdistrict situated in western Yanqing District, Beijing, China. It shares border with Yanqing Town to its north and west, Xiangshuiyuan Subdistrict to its east, and Baiquan Subdistrict to its south. The result of the 2020 Chinese Census determined that Rulin's population was 28,230.

The subdistrict was formed in 2009, and its name Rulin comes from Rulinyuan Microdistrict within its borders.

Geography 
The subdistrict is situated at the north bank of Guishui River, with S323 Expressway passing through the southern region.

Administrative divisions 
As of the time in writing, 10 residential communities constituted Rulin subdistrict, all of which are listed in the table below:

See also 

 List of township-level divisions of Beijing

References 

Subdistricts of Beijing
Yanqing District